Henry Day may refer to:

Pea Ridge Day (Henry Clyde Day, 1899–1934), pitcher in Major League Baseball
Harry Day (rugby player) (1863–1911), Welsh rugby union forward
Henry Day (priest) (1865–1951), British priest
Henry Noble Day (1808–1890), American philosopher
Henry Day (colonel), British soldier

See also

Harry Day (disambiguation)
Day (surname)